Civilization II: Test of Time, released in 1999, is a turn-based strategy game remake of the best selling game Civilization II that was released to compete with Sid Meier's Alpha Centauri. Test of Time's central innovation was the addition of multiple maps and the inclusion of two campaigns concerning science fiction and fantasy themes.

Development 
While the Civilization series had little to no direct competitors, this changed in 1999 when Activision created Civilization: Call to Power. Call to Power was a clone title, which also extended the concept to future space/ocean colonization. This led to a legal battle between Activision and Microprose, which was resolved with Activision able to make further Call to Power games as long as they did not use "Civilization" in the title. Microprose's response was to make a spin-off game entitled Civilization II: Test of Time which, like Call to Power, included themes such as the colonization of Alpha Centauri, science fiction, and fantasy. It would later inspire the open-source project Freeciv. This version had its own mods. It was included in the Sid Meier's Civilization Chronicles pack. The British newspaper Daily Mirror ran a competition wherein they would give away ten copies of the game to readers who correctly answered a history-related question.

Gameplay

The original and extended original campaigns
Test of Time included a version of the old Civilization II campaign, with only a few minor changes. Cosmetically, however, it looked quite different, with all-new art and animated units. Test of Time also offered the option to undertake the Extended Original campaign, which was identical to the Original except that the "pink" slot for a civilization was occupied by aliens on Alpha Centauri. When one built the Alpha Centauri spaceship, instead of ending the game, it unlocked a secondary tech tree and allowed the player to battle the Centaurians.

However, on all versions, the "red" slot for a civilization is always occupied by the barbarians (religious fanatics, barbarians, and guerrillas).

The science-fiction campaign
The Science-Fiction campaign focuses around a mostly fictional planetary system in orbit around the real, nearby star of Lalande 21185. The setup is that the humans along with another species identified only as the "non-humans" both crashland on earthlike Funestis, the second planet. The two species eventually learn to talk with each other and expand to the three other maps, which include the orbital platforms around Funestis left there by the ancient Lalandians, a rocky world called Naumachia, and the center of ancient Lalandian culture, the gas giant Nona. Victory can be accomplished by sending a spaceship back to Earth, by building a quantum gate back to Earth, or by conquering the star system.

The fantasy campaign and Midgard
Test of Time also included a fantasy world modelled after Norse mythology. The four maps of the Fantasy Campaign are the Surface World, the Underground World, the Cloud World, and the Undersea World. The seven species included each started on a different level. The central difference between Midgard and the Fantasy Campaign are the scripted events and premade maps for Midgard.

The civilizations of the Fantasy Campaign consist of five fantasy races and two human civilizations:
 The Elves
 The Merfolk
 The Goblins
 The Stygians (Undead)
 The Buteo (Bird people)
 The Humans, a human civilization similar to Dark Ages Europe
The Infidels, a human civilization similar to various nomadic Asiatic and Eastern European peoples

The Elves, Humans and Infidels are most suited to the Surface World, while the Merfolk are most suited to the Undersea World, the Stygians and Goblins to the Underground World, and the Buteo to the Cloud World. However, all civilizations initially have access to the Surface World, and, as the game progresses, acquire access to all of the Worlds.

There are three ways to win the Fantasy Campaign. A player may complete a Siege Engine that can conquer all evil, may discover the rainbow Bifrost (of true Norse myth) to seek the aid of the gods, or conquer the world.

Midgard scenario
The rules of the Fantasy Campaign were originally designed for the Midgard Scenario and then extrapolated into a non-preset environment. The Midgard Scenario is heavily focused on Norse, Slavic and Celtic mythology, with figures such as Baba Yaga and The Dagda and events such as Ragnarok making appearances.

The Midgard scenario centers around the impending escape of the evil wizard Volsang, who was sealed away many centuries prior to the scenario's opening. The seven civilizations have entirely forgotten about the existence of Volsang, and so the weakening of his bonds has gone unnoticed. At the opening of the scenario, Volsang's forces begin to multiply and threaten the civilizations: most immediately the nearby Infidels, but eventually all.

In addition to the three methods of victory in the Fantasy Campaign, a player may also complete a set of ten quests that exist in-game. (This victory results in the immediate discovery of Bifrost, but is a different manner of victory than intense research.)

Reception 

According to Michael Klappenbach of About.com, "The game was generally panned and not well received by both critics and Civilization fans." The game received average reviews according to the review aggregation website GameRankings.

Jonathan Sutyak of AllGame said the game was "for the most part, an improvement over the original." John Lee of NextGen said of the game, "Maybe it's time to say, 'Okay, enough of a good thing. Bring on Civilization III.'"

Joanna Maria of Techshout named it the third best Civilization game.

References

External links

1999 video games
4X video games
Alpha Centauri in fiction
2: Test of Time
Turn-based strategy video games
Video game remakes
Video games based on Celtic mythology
Video games based on Norse mythology
Video games based on Slavic mythology
Video games developed in the United States
Windows games
Windows-only games